Jaromír Dulava (born 18 December 1960) is a Czech actor.

Selected filmography

Film
 Housata (1980)
 The Inheritance or Fuckoffguysgoodday (1992)
 Černí baroni (1992) 
 Dark Blue World (2001)
 Román pro ženy (2001)
 I Served the King of England (2006)
 Všechno nejlepší! (2006)
 Grandhotel (2006)
 Taková normální rodinka (2008)
 Men in Rut (2009)
 Habermann (2010)
 Milada (2017)
 Insects (2018)
 Toman (2018)
 My Uncle Archimedes (2018)
 Bourák (2020)

Television
 Konec velkých prázdnin (1996)
 Three Kings (1998)
 Hotel Herbich (1999)
 Přízraky mezi námi (2001)
 Útěk do Budína (2002)
 Místo nahoře (2004)
 Bazén (2005)
 Místo v životě (2006)
 Ach, ty vraždy! (2010)
 O mé rodině a jiných mrtvolách (2011)
 Czech Century (2013)
 Škoda lásky (2013)
 Sanitka 2 (2013)
 Neviditelní (2014)
 Život a doba soudce A. K. (2014)
 Doktor Martin (2015)
 Reportérka (2015)
 Vraždy v kruhu (2015)
 Doktorka Kellerová (2016)
 Pouť (2019)
 Most! (2019)
 Zločiny Velké Prahy (2021)
 Osada (2021)
 Hvězdy nad hlavou (2021)
 Revír (2023)

Play
 The Lonesome West (2002)
 Sexual Perversity in Chicago (2004)
 The Blunder (2008)

References

External links
 

 
1960 births
Living people
Czech male film actors
Czech male stage actors
Czech male television actors
21st-century Czech male actors
20th-century Czech male actors
People from Frýdek-Místek
Brno Conservatory alumni